Diego de Jesús Aguilar Millán (born 13 January 1997) is a Mexican professional footballer who plays as a midfielder.

Club career

Early career
Aguilar is currently register under Toluca's filial, Atlético Mexiquense.

Deportivo Toluca
On 29 July 2015, Aguilar made his official debut in a Copa MX match against Necaxa. Toluca won 4–2, Aguilar give one assistance.

Salamanca UDS
Aguillar moved to Spain and joined Salamanca CF UDS on 25 November 2019. However, due to a visa issue, he wasn't able to play for the club until mid-February 2020.

International career
Aguilar was called up for the 2017 FIFA U-20 World Cup.

References

External links

Diego Aguilar at Mexico Sub-20

1997 births
Living people
People from Toluca
Association football midfielders
Footballers from the State of Mexico
Mexican expatriate footballers
Deportivo Toluca F.C. players
Lobos BUAP footballers
Atlante F.C. footballers
Mineros de Zacatecas players
Tlaxcala F.C. players
Ascenso MX players
Segunda División B players
Mexican expatriate sportspeople in Spain
Expatriate footballers in Spain
Mexican footballers